De'Vion Harmon (born January 22, 2001) is an American college basketball player for the Texas Tech Red Raiders of the Big 12 Conference He previously played for the Oregon Ducks and the Oklahoma Sooners.

High school career
Harmon attended John H. Guyer High School in Denton, Texas. He played alongside his childhood friend Jalen Wilson. As a freshman, he averaged 14.1 points, 4.7 rebounds, 4.6 assists and 1.6 steals per game to help his team to a 30–3 record, a District 6-6A title and the area finals. As a sophomore, he averaged 18.7 points, 4.2 rebounds, 4.8 assists and 1.5 steals per game to help his team to a 25–6 record, a District 6-6A title and the Bi-District finals. As a junior, he averaged 15.7 points, 5.2 assists and 1.7 steals per game. As a senior, he averaged 20.3 points, five assists and 4.4 rebounds per game. Harmon was a three-time Texas District 6A co-MVP during his career. He was selected to play in the Nike Hoop Summit. He committed to playing college basketball for Oklahoma over offers from Baylor, Marquette, Oklahoma State and Texas.

College career
On November 5, 2019, Harmon made his college debut, scoring a freshman season-high 23 points in an 85–67 win over UTSA. As a freshman, he averaged 7.4 points per game. On January 23, 2021, Harmon scored 22 points in a 75–68 upset win over ninth-ranked Kansas. As a sophomore, he averaged 12.9 points, 3.4 rebounds and 2 assists per game, earning All-Big 12 honorable mention. After the season, Harmon transferred to Oregon. As a junior, he averaged 10.8 points, 2.6 rebounds, and 2.1 assists in 31.5 minutes per game. Following the season, he transferred to Texas Tech.

National team career
Harmon represented the United States at the 2017 FIBA Under-16 Americas Championship, where he averaged 11.8 points and helped his team win a gold medal. At the 2018 FIBA Under-17 Basketball World Cup, he won another gold medal, averaging 13.1 points and 3.4 assists per game.

Career statistics

College

|-
| style="text-align:left;"| 2019–20
| style="text-align:left;"| Oklahoma
| 31 || 22 || 28.4 || .364 || .343 || .700 || 1.8 || 2.0 || 1.1 || .1 || 7.4
|-
| style="text-align:left;"| 2020–21
| style="text-align:left;"| Oklahoma
| 25 || 23 || 31.9 || .477 || .330 || .732 || 3.4 || 2.0 || 1.1 || .0 || 12.9
|-
| style="text-align:left;"| 2021–22
| style="text-align:left;"| Oregon
| 35 || 34 || 31.4 || .415 || .367 || .734 || 2.6 || 2.1 || 1.3 || .1 || 10.8
|- class="sortbottom"
| style="text-align:center;" colspan="2"| Career
| 91 || 79 || 30.5 || .422 || .349 || .723 || 2.2 || 2.0 || 1.2 || .1 || 10.2

References

External links
Oregon Ducks bio
Oklahoma Sooners bio
USA Basketball bio

2001 births
Living people
American men's basketball players
Basketball players from Texas
Point guards
Oklahoma Sooners men's basketball players
Oregon Ducks men's basketball players
Sportspeople from Plano, Texas
Texas Tech Red Raiders basketball players